

Squad

Out on loan

Transfers

Summer

In:

Out:

Winter

In:

Out:

Competitions

Copa Libertadores

Final stage

Final

Liga MX

Torneo Apertura

Results summary

Results

League table

Liguilla – Apertura

Torneo Clausura

Results summary

Results

League table

Liguilla – Clausura

Copa MX

Due to participating in the 2015–16 CONCACAF Champions League, Tigres UANL did not take part in the Copa MX

CONCACAF Champions League

Group stage

Knockout stage

Final

Squad statistics

Appearances and goals

|-
|colspan="14"|Players away from Tigres UANL on loan:

|-
|colspan="14"|Players who appeared for Tigres UANL no longer at the club:

|}

Goal scorers

Disciplinary record

References

External links 
 Tigres UANL at Soccerway.com

Mexican football club seasons
Tigres UANL